The 2013 NCAA Division I men's basketball tournament was a single-elimination tournament that involved 68 teams playing to determine the national champion of men's NCAA Division I college basketball. It began on March 19, 2013, and concluded with the championship game on April 8, 2013, at the Georgia Dome in Atlanta. This was the 75th edition of the NCAA Men's Basketball Championship, dating to 1939.

The Final Four consisted of Louisville, Wichita State (second appearance), Syracuse (first appearance since their 2003 national championship), and Michigan, returning for the first time since the Fab Five's second appearance in 1993 (later vacated). By winning the West Region, Wichita State became the first #9 seed and first Missouri Valley Conference (MVC) team to reach the Final Four since the tournament expanded to 64 teams in 1985. The last #9 seed to reach the Final Four was Penn, and the last MVC team to do so was Indiana State, both in 1979.

Louisville defeated Michigan in the championship game by a final score of 82–76, winning their first national title since 1986. On February 20, 2018, the NCAA vacated Louisville's entire tournament run, including its national title, due to a 2015 sex scandal.

The tournament featured several notable upsets. For the first time since 1991, at least one team seeded #9 through #15 won at least once in the tournament. The most notable was Florida Gulf Coast University of the Atlantic Sun Conference, who made their tournament debut in only their second year of Division I eligibility. They upset Georgetown and San Diego State in their first two games, becoming the first #15 seed to advance to the regional semifinals (where they were defeated by Florida). For the first time since 2010, a #14 seed won as Harvard defeated New Mexico in the West Region. The same region saw #13 La Salle, who won in the opening round, defeat #4 Kansas State and #12 Mississippi defeat #5 Wisconsin. In addition to that, the region's top seed, Gonzaga, was defeated in the round of 32 by eventual region winner Wichita State, who defeated La Salle in the Sweet Sixteen.

Two other teams also earned their first ever NCAA Tournament victory: Ivy League champion Harvard and Mid-Eastern Athletic Conference (MEAC) champion North Carolina A&T.

Schedule and venues

The following are the sites selected to host each round of the 2013 tournament:

First Four
March 19 and 20
University of Dayton Arena, Dayton, Ohio (Host: University of Dayton)

Second and third rounds
March 21 and 23
The Palace of Auburn Hills, Auburn Hills, Michigan (Host: Oakland University)
Rupp Arena, Lexington, Kentucky (Host: University of Kentucky)
EnergySolutions Arena, Salt Lake City, Utah (Host: University of Utah)
HP Pavilion, San Jose, California (Host: West Coast Conference)
March 22 and 24
University of Dayton Arena, Dayton, Ohio  (Host: University of Dayton)
Frank Erwin Center, Austin, Texas (Host: University of Texas at Austin)
Sprint Center, Kansas City, Missouri (Host: Missouri Valley Conference)
Wells Fargo Center, Philadelphia, Pennsylvania (Host: Temple University)

Regional semifinals and Finals
March 28 and 30
East Regional, Verizon Center, Washington, D.C.  (Host: Georgetown University)
West Regional, Staples Center, Los Angeles, California (Host: Pepperdine University)
March 29 and 31
Midwest Regional, Lucas Oil Stadium, Indianapolis, Indiana (Hosts: IUPUI, Horizon League)
South Regional, Cowboys Stadium, Arlington, Texas (Host: Big 12 Conference)

National semifinals and championship (Final Four and championship)
April 6 and 8
Georgia Dome, Atlanta, Georgia (Host: Georgia Institute of Technology)

Qualified teams

Automatic qualifiers

The following teams were automatic qualifiers for the 2013 NCAA field by virtue of winning their conference's tournament (except for the Ivy League, whose regular-season champion received the automatic bid).

Tournament seeds

*See First Four.

Bracket
* – Denotes overtime period

Unless otherwise noted, all times listed are Eastern Daylight Time (UTC−04)

First Four – Dayton, Ohio
The First Four games involved eight teams: the four overall lowest-ranked teams, and the four lowest-ranked at-large teams.

Midwest Regional – Indianapolis, Indiana

Midwest Regional all-tournament team
Regional all-tournament team: Seth Curry, Duke; Gorgui Dieng, Louisville; Mason Plumlee, Duke; Peyton Siva, Louisville

Regional most outstanding player: Russ Smith, Louisville

West Regional – Los Angeles, California

West Regional all-tournament team
Regional all-tournament team: Carl Hall, Wichita State; Mark Lyons, Arizona; LaQuinton Ross, Ohio State; Deshaun Thomas, Ohio State

Regional most outstanding player: Malcolm Armstead, Wichita State

South Regional – Arlington, Texas

South Regional all-tournament team
Regional all-tournament team: Mitch McGary, Michigan; Ben McLemore, Kansas; Mike Rosario, Florida; Nik Stauskas, Michigan

Regional most outstanding player: Trey Burke, Michigan

East Regional – Washington, D.C.

East Regional all-tournament team
Regional all-tournament team: Vander Blue, Marquette; C. J. Fair, Syracuse; Davante Gardner, Marquette; James Southerland, Syracuse

Regional most outstanding player: Michael Carter-Williams, Syracuse

Final Four – Georgia Dome, Atlanta, Georgia
During the Final Four round, the champion of the top overall top seed's region was to play against the champion of the fourth-ranked top seed's region, and the champion of the second overall top seed's region was to play against the champion of the third-ranked top seed's region. Louisville (placed in the Midwest Regional) was selected as the top overall seed, and Gonzaga (in the West Regional) was named as the final top seed. Thus, the Midwest champion played the West Champion in one semifinal game, and the South Champion faced the East Champion in the other semifinal game.

Wichita State surprised the college basketball world by reaching the Final Four from the West region. They lost to Louisville in the first semifinal game, 72–68. Michigan defeated Syracuse 61–56 in the second semifinal.

On February 20, 2018, NCAA took away from Louisville the 2013 winning title and allowed them to pay the fines.

Final Four all-tournament team

Final Four all-tournament team: Spike Albrecht, Michigan; Trey Burke, Michigan; Mitch McGary, Michigan; Cleanthony Early, Wichita State; Peyton Siva, Louisville; Luke Hancock, Louisville; Chane Behanan, Louisville;

Final Four most outstanding player: Luke Hancock, Louisville (the first non-starter to earn this title)

Game summaries

Elite Eight

Final Four

National Championship

Louisville defeated Michigan 82–76 in the championship game. The win gave Louisville its first championship since 1986, and third overall.  It became the eighth school to win at least three championships  until vacated by the NCAA on February 20, 2018, due to a 2015 sex scandal.

Head coach Rick Pitino became the first coach to win an NCAA championship with two different schools.  Michigan fell to 1–5 all time in championship games (including two losses vacated because of sanctions against the university).

Michigan's Trey Burke scored seven quick points to get Michigan out to a 7–3 lead, but also picked up two quick fouls and sat during much of the first half.  With Burke on the bench, Michigan got a spark from freshman Spike Albrecht, a minor role player during the regular season.  Albrecht hit four straight 3-pointers en route to a 17-point first half performance, easily surpassing his previous single game best of 7.  Louisville trailed Michigan 35–23 late in the first half, before going on a run fueled by four straight three-pointers by Luke Hancock.  At halftime, Michigan led 38–37.  

The second half featured several lead changes before Louisville pushed the margin to 10 on a three-pointer by Hancock with 3:20 remaining in the game.  Michigan fought back, closing the gap to four points in the last minute, but ran out of time in its comeback effort.

Hancock hit all five three-point shots he attempted in the game and led Louisville with 22 points, while teammate Peyton Siva scored 18 and had a game high 4 steals.  Chane Behanan pulled down 12 rebounds to go with 15 points.  Burke led Michigan with 24 points. Russ Smith, Louisville's leading scorer on the season, struggled in the game, shooting 3-for-16. Hancock was named as the game's most outstanding player.

Record by conference

The R64, R32, S16, E8, F4, CG, and NC columns indicate how many teams from each conference were in the round of 64 (second round), round of 32 (third round), Sweet 16, Elite Eight, Final Four, championship game, and national champion, respectively.
The Big South and NEC each had one representative, eliminated in the first round with a record of 0–1.
The America East Conference, Big Sky, Big West, Horizon League, MAAC, MAC, OVC, Patriot League, Southern Conference, Southland Conference, Summit League, SWAC, and WAC each had one representative, eliminated in the second round with a record of 0–1.
The Sun Belt Conference had two representatives, one eliminated in the first round and the other in the second round, with a record of 0–2.

Other events surrounding the tournament
On May 10, 2012, the NCAA announced that as part of the celebration of the 75th Division I tournament, it would hold all three of its men's basketball championship games in Atlanta. The finals of the Division II and Division III tournaments were held at Philips Arena on April 7, the day between the Division I semifinals and final. In addition, Atlanta-based tournament broadcaster TBS announced that Conan O'Brien would tape his Conan talk show at The Tabernacle, located a few blocks from the Georgia Dome and Philips Arena, in the week leading up to the Final Four. March Madness studio analyst Charles Barkley and Dick Vitale were among the guests who appeared.

Media

U.S. television
The year 2013 marked the third year of a 14-year partnership between CBS and Turner cable networks TBS, TNT and truTV to cover the entire tournament under the NCAA March Madness banner. CBS aired the Final Four and championship rounds for the 32nd consecutive year.  The tournament was considered a ratings success. Tournament games averaged 10.7 million viewers, and the championship game garnered an average of 23.4 million viewers and a peak viewership of 27.1 million.

Studio hosts
Greg Gumbel (New York City and Atlanta) – Second Round, Third round, Regionals, Final Four and National Championship Game
Ernie Johnson Jr. (New York City and Atlanta) – First Four, second round, Third round and Regional Semi-Finals
Matt Winer (Atlanta) – First Four, second round and third round

Studio analysts
Greg Anthony (New York City and Atlanta) – First Four, second round, Third round, Regionals, Final Four and National Championship Game
Charles Barkley (New York City and Atlanta) – First Four, second round, Third round, Regionals, Final Four and National Championship Game
Rex Chapman (Atlanta) – First Four and Second Round
Seth Davis (Atlanta) – First Four, second round, Third round and Regional Semi-Finals
Jamie Dixon (Atlanta) – Third round
Doug Gottlieb (New York City and Atlanta) – Regionals, Final Four and National Championship Game
Kenny Smith (New York City and Atlanta) – Second Round, Third round, Regionals, Final Four and National Championship Game
Steve Smith (Atlanta) – First Four, second round, Third round and Regional Semi-Finals
Jay Wright (Atlanta) – Regional Semi-Finals

Commentary teams
Jim Nantz/Clark Kellogg/Steve Kerr/Tracy Wolfson – First Four at Dayton, Ohio; Second and third round at Dayton, Ohio; Midwest Regional at Indianapolis, Indiana; Final Four at Atlanta, GeorgiaKerr joins Nantz and Kellogg during the Final Four and National Championship games
Marv Albert/Steve Kerr/Craig Sager – First Four at Dayton, Ohio; Second and third round at Kansas City, Missouri; South Regional at Arlington, Texas
Verne Lundquist/Bill Raftery/Rachel Nichols – Second and third round at Auburn Hills, Michigan; East Regional at Washington, D.C.
Kevin Harlan/Len Elmore/Reggie Miller/Lewis Johnson – Second and third round at Philadelphia, Pennsylvania; West Regional at Los Angeles, California
Ian Eagle/Jim Spanarkel/Allie LaForce – Second and third round at Lexington, Kentucky
Brian Anderson/Dan Bonner/Marty Snider – Second and third round at San Jose, California
Tim Brando/Mike Gminski/Otis Livingston – Second and third round at Austin, Texas
Spero Dedes/Doug Gottlieb/Jaime Maggio – Second and third round at Salt Lake City, Utah

Radio
Dial Global Sports (formerly Westwood One) and SiriusXM have live broadcasts of all 67 games.

First four
Brad Sham and Kyle Macy – at Dayton, Ohio

Second and third rounds
Tom McCarthy and Kelly Tripucka – Second and third round at Auburn Hills, Michigan
Kevin Kugler and Jamal Mashburn – Second and third round at Lexington, Kentucky
Dave Sims and Kevin Grevey – Second and third round at Salt Lake City, Utah
Ted Robinson and Bill Frieder – Second and third round at San Jose, California
Gary Cohen and Pete Gillen – Second and third round at Dayton, Ohio
Wayne Larrivee and Reid Gettys – Second and third round at Austin, Texas
Kevin Calabro and Will Perdue – Second and third round at Kansas City, Missouri
Scott Graham and John Thompson – Second and third round at Philadelphia, Pennsylvania

Regionals
Ian Eagle and John Thompson – East Regional at Washington, D.C.
Kevin Kugler and Pete Gillen – Midwest Regional at Indianapolis, Indiana
Brad Sham and Fran Fraschilla – South Regional at Arlington, Texas
Wayne Larrivee and Bill Frieder – West Regional at Los Angeles, California

Final Four
Kevin Kugler, John Thompson and Bill Raftery – Atlanta, Georgia

Local radio
Matt Shephard and David Merritt – (Michigan), (WWJ), (Detroit) & (WWWW), (Ann Arbor)
Paul Rogers and Bob Valvano – (Louisville), (WHAS), (Louisville) & (WWRW), (Lexington)

International
ESPN International held broadcast rights to the tournament outside of the United States: it produced its own broadcasts of the semi-final and championship game, called by ESPN College Basketball personalities Brad Nessler (play-by-play), Dick Vitale (analyst for the final and one semi-final), and Jay Bilas (analyst for the other semi-final). For the initial rounds, they use CBS/Turner coverage with an additional host to transition between games, with whiparound coverage similar to the CBS-only era. ESPN also has exclusive digital rights to the NCAA tournament outside of North America.

Canada
In Canada, the TSN family of media outlets (including TSN2, RDS, and TSN Radio), which are part-owned by ESPN, own broadcast rights to the tournament. TSN produces separate studio coverage with Kate Beirness, Jack Armstrong, Dan Shulman and Sam Mitchell, but simulcasts CBS/Turner game coverage for the first five rounds (and ESPN International coverage for the Final Four).

As in past years, TSN and TSN2 carry whiparound coverage (often in parallel) during the second, third and fourth rounds, in 2013 focusing when possible on games not being broadcast on CBS (as that network, but not the Turner channels, is also widely available in Canada).

See also
 2013 NCAA Division II men's basketball tournament
 2013 NCAA Division III men's basketball tournament
 2013 NCAA Division I women's basketball tournament
 2013 NCAA Division II women's basketball tournament
 2013 NCAA Division III women's basketball tournament
 2013 National Invitation Tournament
 2013 Women's National Invitation Tournament
 2013 NAIA Division I men's basketball tournament
 2013 NAIA Division II men's basketball tournament
 2013 NAIA Division I women's basketball tournament
 2013 NAIA Division II women's basketball tournament
 2013 College Basketball Invitational
 2013 CollegeInsider.com Postseason Tournament

Notes

References

Ncaa tournament
NCAA Division I men's basketball tournament
NCAA Division I men's basketball tournament
NCAA Division I men's basketball tournament
NCAA Division I men's basketball tournament
Basketball competitions in Atlanta
College basketball tournaments in Georgia (U.S. state)
Basketball competitions in Austin, Texas
Basketball in the Dallas–Fort Worth metroplex